Indy 500 is a 1977 racing video game developed by Atari, Inc. for its Video Computer System (later known as the Atari 2600). It is themed around the Indianapolis 500, and is based on Atari's earlier 8-player arcade game, Indy 800.

Indy 500 was one of the nine launch titles offered when the Atari 2600 went on sale in September 1977. Sears Tele-Games later re-released it as Race. Included with each game was a set of two driving controllers, which were identical in appearance to the 2600 paddle controller but could rotate indefinitely in either direction, among other differences.

Gameplay

Though the packaging material claims it to have fourteen games, this number treats each of the various tracks as a "game". There are actually only three unique game modes, which are as follows. Each can be played with one or two players, and with either a time limit or a score limit.

 Standard racing: Players can race against the clock to complete as many laps as they can, or compete to finish 25 laps (requires two players). A number of courses were featured, which all have "Ice Race" variations featuring slippery physics.
 Crash and Score: This mode requires two players, but one can be computer-controlled. Either way, the goal is to seek out and drive into a white square randomly placed on the track; this will earn whichever player points, and the square will then be randomly placed elsewhere.
 Tag: Similar to the above, this is a two-player mode only. This is essentially tag; whoever has the blinking car gains points by avoiding the other player's car who gains points by "tagging" the blinking car, after which the roles of the players are reversed.

Reception 
In 1995, Flux magazine ranked the game 58th on their "Top 100 Video Games."

See also

List of Atari 2600 games
Dodge 'Em (1980)
Math Gran Prix (1982)

References

1977 video games
Atari games
Atari 2600 games
IndyCar Series video games
North America-exclusive video games
Top-down racing video games
Video games developed in the United States
Video games set in Indianapolis